Mao Dun Literature Prize is a prize for novels, established in the will of prominent Chinese writer Mao Dun (for which he personally donated 250,000 RMB) and sponsored by the China Writers Association.  Awarded every four years, it is one of the most prestigious literature prizes in China. It was first awarded in 1982.

Selection rules
According to selection rule, any work, authored by Chinese nationals, published in mainland China, and with over 130,000 characters, is eligible.

The selection committee in the Chinese Writers Association holds the voting poll twice, and the winner must receive over 2/3 of the votes cast. The process is highly selective and each time, the number of winners is between three and five. The prize is awarded every four years, though it was originally awarded every three years.

Criticism
The award was recently criticized for the 2011 awards, when it was revealed that eight of the top ten on the list were either the chair or vice-chairpersons of prominent provincial writers' associations. An editorial in the China Daily stated "official status cannot and should not be a criterion for literary excellence. That's why people doubt the authenticity of prizes that are awarded to officials for their literary achievements."

To avoid such controversy, novelist Tie Ning decided her works will not enter the awards as long as she is chairwoman of China Writers Association, a position she took in 2006.

Winners and nominees

1982 (1st)
Orient (东方) by Wei Wei 
Xu Mao and His Daughters (许茂和他的女儿们) by Zhou Keqin 
Li Zicheng (李自成) by Yao Xueyin (biographical novel on Li Zicheng)
General's Chant (将军吟) by Mo Yingfeng
Spring in Winter (冬天里的春天) by Li Guowen
A Small Town Called Hibiscus (芙蓉镇) by Gu Hua

1985 (2nd)
Leaden Wings (沉重的翅膀) by Zhang Jie
The Wedding Party (钟鼓楼) by Liu Xinwu
Yellow River Flowing to East (黄河东流去) by Li Zhun

1991 (3rd)
Ordinary World (平凡的世界) by Lu Yao
Son of Heaven (少年天子) by Ling Li
Metropolis (都市风流) by Sun Li and Yu Xiaohui
The Second Sun (第二个太阳) by Liu Baiyu
The Jade King (穆斯林的葬禮) by Huo Da
Blood on the Luoxiao Mountains (浴血罗霄) by Xiao Ke (honorary award)
Broken Golden Bowl (金瓯缺) by Xu Xingye (honorary award)

1997 (4th)
White Deer Plain (白鹿原) by Chen Zhongshi
War and People (战争和人) by Wang Huo
White Gate Willow (白门柳) by Liu Sifen
Unsettled Autumn (骚动之秋) by Liu Yumin

2000 (5th)
Awarded in Mao Dun's hometown, Tongxiang, Zhejiang on November 11, 2000
Red Poppies (尘埃落定) by Alai
The Song of Everlasting Sorrow (长恨歌) by Wang Anyi
Decision (抉择) by Zhang Ping
Trilogy of the Tea Masters (茶人三部曲) by Wang Xufeng

2005 (6th)
Zhang Juzheng (張居正) by Xiong Zhaozheng (biographical novel on Zhang Juzheng)
Wordless (无字) by Zhang Jie
Sky of History (历史的天空) by Chu Chunqiu
Heroic Time (英雄时代) by Liu Jianwei
Eastern Concealment (东藏记) by Zong Pu

2008 (7th)
The Shaanxi Opera (秦腔) by Jia Pingwa
The Last Quarter of the Moon (额尔古纳河右岸) by Chi Zijian
In the Dark (暗算) by Mai Jia
The Sons of Red Lake (湖光山色) by Zhou Daxin

References

External links
 Mao Dun Literature Prize

 
Chinese literary awards
Awards established in 1982
Chinese-language literary awards
1982 establishments in China